Bannada Gejje is a 1990 Indian Kannada-language film written and directed by Rajendra Singh Babu starring Ravichandran and Amala. The music is scored by Hamsalekha. The supporting cast features Bharathi Vishnuvardhan, Kalyan Kumar, Suresh Heblikar, Amjad Khan and Devaraj. The film was simultaneously shot in Telugu as Prema Yuddham.

Cast
 Ravichandran as Manu
 Amala as Menaka
 Bharathi Vishnuvardhan as Vaijayantidevi
 Kalyan Kumar as Peter
 Suresh Heblikar as Suresh Jayasimha
 Amjad Khan Taxi Driver
 Devaraj as Deluxe
 Tennis Krishna
 Sihi Kahi Chandru

Soundtrack

Hamsalekha composed the film's background score and music for its soundtrack, also writing its lyrics. The soundtrack album consists of seven tracks. The songs were chartbusters and created a massive hype.

References

1990s Kannada-language films
1990 films
Films scored by Hamsalekha
Kannada films remade in other languages
Films directed by Rajendra Singh Babu